Chilperic (sometimes Childeric in the chronicles of the time) was the infant son of Charibert II, and briefly king of Aquitaine in 632.  He was killed shortly after his father in 632, under orders by Dagobert I, Charibert's half-brother.

630s births
632 deaths
Murdered royalty
Monarchs who died as children
Medieval child monarchs
7th-century Frankish kings
People from Aquitaine